The St. Regis River (or rivière Saint-Régis in Quebec) is an  river in northern New York in the United States. It flows into the Saint Lawrence River at the hamlet of Saint Regis in the St. Regis Mohawk Reservation.  The Saint Regis River basin includes Upper and Lower St. Regis Lakes, and Saint Regis Pond in the Saint Regis Canoe Area. It's a great fishery for trout.

Toponymy 
The toponym "rivière Saint-Régis" was made official on December 5, 1968 at the Commission de toponymie du Québec.

See also
List of rivers in New York
List of rivers of Quebec

References

External links
  St. Regis River regional information 
  St. Regis watershed information

Adirondacks
Rivers of New York (state)
Rivers of Franklin County, New York
Tributaries of the Saint Lawrence River